Laos traffic signs use Lao, the national language of Laos. However, English is also used for stop and important public places such as tourist attractions, airports, railway stations, and immigration checkpoints. Both Lao and English are used on directional signage.

Laos signed the Vienna Convention on Road Signs and Signals but has yet to ratify it.

Warning signs

Priority signs

Regulatory signs

Informatory signs

Additional panels curve chevron danger sign

External links
http://www.elve.net/rkidlao.htm
http://laoroadsafety.blogspot.com/p/blog-page_6.html

Road transport in Laos
Laos